The 1978 Houston Astros season was a season in American baseball. The team finished fifth in the National League West with a record of 74-88, 21 games behind the Los Angeles Dodgers.

Offseason 
 October 13, 1977: Al Javier was traded by the Astros to the Chicago Cubs for Keith Drumright.
 November 18, 1977: Oscar Zamora was signed as a free agent by the Astros.
 December 19, 1977: Jesús Alou was signed as a free agent by the Houston Astros.

Regular season

Season standings

Record vs. opponents

Notable transactions 
 April 6, 1978: Bob Coluccio was signed as a free agent by the Astros.
 June 6, 1978: Danny Heep was drafted by the Astros in the 2nd round of the 1978 Major League Baseball draft.
 June 8, 1978: Bob Coluccio was traded by the Astros to the St. Louis Cardinals for Frank Riccelli.
 September 2, 1978: Dan Larson was traded by the Astros to the Philadelphia Phillies for Dan Warthen.
 September 5, 1978: Gene Pentz was released by the Astros.

Roster

Player stats

Batting

Starters by position 
Note: Pos = Position; G = Games played; AB = At bats; H = Hits; Avg. = Batting average; HR = Home runs; RBI = Runs batted in

Other batters 
Note: G = Games played; AB = At bats; H = Hits; Avg. = Batting average; HR = Home runs; RBI = Runs batted in

Pitching

Starting pitchers 
Note: G = Games pitched; IP = Innings pitched; W = Wins; L = Losses; ERA = Earned run average; SO = Strikeouts

Other pitchers 
Note: G = Games pitched; IP = Innings pitched; W = Wins; L = Losses; ERA = Earned run average; SO = Strikeouts

Relief pitchers 
Note: G = Games pitched; W = Wins; L = Losses; SV = Saves; ERA = Earned run average; SO = Strikeouts

Farm system

References

External links
1978 Houston Astros season at Baseball Reference

Houston Astros seasons
Houston Astros season
Houston Astro